The 2016 The Citadel Bulldogs football team represented The Citadel, The Military College of South Carolina in the 2016 NCAA Division I FCS football season. The Bulldogs were led by first-year head coach Brent Thompson and played their home games at Johnson Hagood Stadium. They played as members of the Southern Conference, as they have since 1936.

With their win over Samford on November 4, the Bulldogs clinched their second consecutive, and fourth overall, SoCon championship.  By virtue of their victory over VMI on November 12, 2016, The Citadel completed their first undefeated SoCon season in program history and claimed the championship outright.  The win over VMI also marked the second time in program history that the Bulldogs earned double digit wins in one season, after winning 11 games in 1992.

They finished the season 10–2, 8–0 in SoCon play to win the SoCon title. They received the SoCon's automatic bid to the FCS Playoffs where they lost in the second round to Wofford.

Schedule
The Bulldogs planned to host  for their traditional Parents' Day game on October 8.  Due to Hurricane Matthew, the game against North Greenville took place at NGU's Younts Stadium in Tigerville, South Carolina on Thursday, October 6.

Stadium issues
In 2016, The Citadel determined that lead paint needed remediation on the east (visitor's) side of Johnson Hagood Stadium.  The work resulted in the entire east side being closed for the first game of the season against Furman and some sections being opened for subsequent games.  The capacity was thus 10,500 for the first game and about 15,000 for later games.

Game summaries

Mercer

Furman

Gardner–Webb

Western Carolina

North Greenville

Chattanooga

Wofford

East Tennessee State

Samford

VMI

North Carolina

FCS playoffs

Second round – Wofford

Ranking movements

References

Citadel
The Citadel Bulldogs football seasons
Southern Conference football champion seasons
Citadel
Citadel Bulldogs football